Paul Anton de Lagarde (2 November 1827 – 22 December 1891) was a German biblical scholar and orientalist, sometimes regarded as one of the greatest orientalists of the 19th century. Lagarde's strong support of anti-Semitism, vocal opposition to Christianity, racial Darwinism and anti-Slavism are viewed as having been among the most influential in supporting the ideology of Nazism.<ref>Fascism: Intellectual origins, Encyclopaedia Britannica</ref>Johnson, Paul (1983), “Modern Times”, Harper and Row: New York

His great learning and gifts were mixed with dogmatism and distrust in the activities of others. In politics, he belonged to the Prussian Conservative party. He died in Göttingen on 22 December 1891.

Early life and education
De Lagarde was born in Berlin as Paul Bötticher; in early adulthood he legally adopted the family name of his maternal line out of respect for his great-aunt who raised him.  At Humboldt University of Berlin (1844–1846) and University of Halle-Wittenberg (1846–1847) he studied theology, philosophy and Oriental languages.

In 1852 his studies took him to London and Paris.

Career
In 1854 he became a teacher at a Berlin public school, but this did not interrupt his biblical studies. In 1866 he received three years leave of absence to collect fresh materials, and in 1869 succeeded German orientalist and theologian Heinrich Ewald as professor of oriental languages at the University of Göttingen.  Like Ewald, Lagarde was an active worker in a variety of subjects and languages; but his chief aim, the elucidation of the Bible, was almost always kept in view. Lagarde was easily the most renowned Septuagint scholar of the nineteenth century, and he devoted himself ardently to Oriental studies.

Political interests
Parallel to his academic work, he attempted to establish a German national religion whose most striking manifestations were an aggressive anti-Semitism, anti-slavism and expansionism. He held few concrete religious beliefs at the ready for his postulated national religion as his first political treatise Über das Verhältnis des deutschen Staates zu Theologie, Kirche und Religion. Ein Versuch Nicht-Theologen zu orientieren (On the Relationship of the German State to Theology, Church and Religion: An Attempted Orientation for Non-Theologians) demonstrates. In regard to the state, he called for its initial and most important task to be to create a climate in which a national religion could flourish. Meanwhile, he obliged those who had faith in God to a radical morality wherein they distinguish solely between "duty or sin" in their every action. In addition, first a formal language must be developed for the religiosity of these newborn men. In the second part of his 1875 book, Über die gegenwärtige Lage des deutschen Reichs. Ein Bericht (On the Current Situation of the German Reich: A Report), he connected thereto and specified as follows:

The historian Ulrich Sieg classifies his position as follows: "He despised the Christianity that he considered bland and lukewarm and hoped for a folkish religion of the future." Lagarde was conversant with Adolf Stoecker, the founder of the anti-Semitic Berlin Movement. He also showed interest in folkish-anti-Semitic societies such as the Deutscher Volksverein of Bernhard Förster and Max Liebermann von Sonnenberg, as well as the Deutschsoziale Partei of Theodor Fritsch. To the latter, he established contact in 1886 by sending his treatise Die nächsten Pflichten deutscher Politik (The Coming Tasks of German Politics), at the core of which he considered to be a German policy of settlement in Eastern Europe. In German Writings, in which he compiled his previously published political essays, there can be found numerous anti-Semitic passages in which we learn, among other things, that he considered Jews to be the greatest barrier to German unification, whereas he simultaneously avowed the concept of a German colonization of southeastern Europe and proposed that the Jewish population settled there at the time be resettled to Palestine or Madagascar. The only alternatives for Lagarde were the total assimilation or emigration of the Jews.

In his 1887 essay "Jews and Indo-Germanics", he wrote: “One would have to have a heart of steel to not feel sympathy for the poor Germans and, by the same token, to not hate the Jews, to not hate and despise those who – out of humanity! – advocate for the Jews or are too cowardly to crush these vermin. Trichinella and bacilli would not be negotiated with, trichinella and bacilli would also not be nurtured, they would be destroyed as quickly and as thoroughly as possible."

In addition to his influence on anti-Semitism and anti-slavism, Lagarde is also of importance to the formation of German imperialist thought. In this regard, he concentrated on German border colonization within Europe rather than the acquisition of overseas colonies. This bears a close resemblance to the later concept of German Lebensraum most notably espoused by Friedrich Ratzel. In 1875, Lagarde maintained that the primary objective of German politics was the "gradual Germanization of Poland." Since he was concerned about how many Germans emigrated in their search for land, he advocated a border colonizing land acquisition for the peasantry, which he considered the "true foundation of the state." This land acquisition aimed to create a Mitteleuropa under German leadership "that reaches from the Ems to the mouth of the Danube, from the Neman to Trieste, from Metz to about the Bug."

In his 1918 book, The New Europe, Tomáš Masaryk regards Lagarde as one of the leading philosophical and theological spokesmen of Pan-Germanism, and furthermore describes Heinrich von Treitschke as its historian, Wilhelm II as its politician and Friedrich Ratzel as its geopolitical geographer. In all of them he saw the representatives of the imperialistic "German Drang nach Osten" that threatened the Slavic countries.

Legacy
Lagarde's anti-Semitism laid the foundations for aspects of National Socialist ideology, in particular that of Alfred Rosenberg. He argued that Germany should create a "national" form of Christianity purged of Semitic elements and insisted that Jews were "pests and parasites" who should be destroyed "as speedily and thoroughly as possible".Stern, Fritz The Politics of Cultural Despair: a study in the Rise of the Germanic Ideology, 1961 (see Chapter I, "Paul de Lagarde and a Germanic Religion"). His library now belongs to the New York University.

Works
He edited the Didascalia apostolorum syriace (1854) and other Syriac texts collected in the British Museum and in Paris. He edited the Aramaic translation (known as the Targum) of the Prophets according to the Codex Reuchlinianus preserved at Karlsruhe, Prophetae chaldaice (1872), the Hagiographa chaldaice (1874), an Arabic translation of the Gospels, Die vier Evangelien, arabisch aus der Wiener Handschrift herausgegeben (1864), a Syriac translation of the Old Testament Apocrypha, Libri V. T. apocryphi syriace (1865), a Coptic translation of the Pentateuch, Der Pentateuch koptisch (1867), and a part of the Lucianic text of the Septuagint, which he was able to reconstruct from manuscripts for nearly half the Old Testament.

Of the Armenians he published Zur Urgeschichte der Armenier (1854) and Armenische Studien (1877).  He was also a student of Persian, publishing Isaias persice (1883) and Persische Studien (1884).  In 1880, de Lagarde attempted to reconstruct a Syriac version of Epiphanius' treatise, On Weights and Measures, which he entitled, Veteris Testamenti ab Origene recensiti fragmenta apud Syros servata quinque. Praemittitur Epiphanii de mensuris et ponderibus liber nunc primum integer et ipse syriacus (Gootingae 1880). He followed up his Coptic studies with Aegyptiaca (1883), and published many minor contributions to the study of oriental languages in Gesammelte Abhandlungen (1866), Symmicta (1. 1877, ii. 1880), Semitica (i. 1878, ii. 1879), Orientalia (1879–1880) and Mittheilungen (1884).  Mention should also be made of the valuable Onomastica sacra (1870; 2nd ed., 1887).

He edited:
 
 

In Deutsche Schriften (1878–81; 4th ed., Göttingen, 1903), he attempted to involve himself in politics. It deals with the position of the German state relative to theology, the church and religion. It became a nationalist text.

Notes

References
  This work in turn cites:
 Herzog-Hauck, Realencyklopädie Anna de Lagarde, Paul de Lagarde (1894)

Further reading
 Heike Behlmer, Thomas L. Gertzen and Orell Witthuhn. Der Nachlass Paul de Lagarde. Orientalistische Netzwerke und antisemitische Verflechtungen. De Gruyter Oldenbourg. Europäisch-jüdische Studien - Beiträge, 46. De Gruyter (2020) - https://www.degruyter.com/view/title/540282?format=G&rskey=qGGhF5&result=1 and DOI: 10.1515/9783110615463
 Ulrich Sieg, Deutschlands Prophet. Paul de Lagarde und die Ursprünge des modernen Antisemitismus (München, Carl Hanser 2007).
 Fritz Stern, The Politics of Cultural Despair'' (1961).

External links

Collection of Lagarde's writings at Archive.org
Der Pentateuch Koptisch Herausgegeben von Paul de Lagarde

1827 births
1891 deaths
Writers from Berlin
German biblical scholars
Christian Hebraists
German orientalists
German nationalists
Corresponding members of the Saint Petersburg Academy of Sciences
History of Madagascar
People from the Province of Brandenburg
Syriacists
Humboldt University of Berlin alumni
Martin Luther University of Halle-Wittenberg alumni
Academic staff of the Martin Luther University of Halle-Wittenberg
Academic staff of the University of Göttingen
German male non-fiction writers